Banzaï is a 1983 French comedy film directed by Claude Zidi and starring Coluche.

Plot
Michel Bernardin works at Planet Assistance, an organisation who helps out Frenchmen who are in trouble in foreign countries.

Behind the scenes
 The picture was shot in Hong Kong, the United States, Africa and France and has become a cult film.
 According to Valérie Mairesse, Coluche suggested her as a remplacement for singer actress Karen Cheryl (aka Isabelle Morizet), first cast as his girlfriend, when the latter's agent opposed to her involvement in that production.

Cast and roles
 Coluche - Michel Bernardin
 Valérie Mairesse - Isabelle Parisse
 Marthe Villalonga - Madame Bernardin
 Éva Darlan - Carole
 Zabou Breitman - Sophia
 Didier Kaminka - Cousin Paul
 Pascal N'Zonzi - Police Chief
 François Perrot - The boss of 'Mondial S.O.S.'

Sources

External links
 

French comedy films
1983 films
Films directed by Claude Zidi
Films scored by Vladimir Cosma
Films shot in Hong Kong
Films shot in the United States
Films shot in Tunisia
Films set in Hong Kong
United States in fiction
France in fiction
Africa in fiction
1980s French films